Egg Rock Light can refer to:
Egg Rock Light (Maine) in Frenchman Bay
Egg Rock Light (Massachusetts) formerly in Nahant, Massachusetts